Stara Emetivka (Staraya Emetovka) is a village in Odesa Raion, Odesa Oblast, Ukraine. It belongs to Usatove rural hromada, one of the hromadas of Ukraine, and is one of 15 villages in the hromada. It has a population of 21. 

Until 18 July 2020, Stara Emetivka belonged to Biliaivka Raion. The raion was abolished in July 2020 as part of the administrative reform of Ukraine, which reduced the number of raions of Odesa Oblast to seven. The area of Biliaivka Raion was merged into Odesa Raion.

Etymology

There are two Emetivka's, Nova and Stara Emetivka. Stara (Стара) means old in Ukrainian. Stara Emetivka means old Emetivka.

Population census
As of January 12, 1989, Stara Emetivka had a population of 63. 30 men and 33 women.

As of December 5, 2001, Stara Emetivka had a population of 47.

Language distribution
It shows three languages in the Stara Emetivka language distribution.

See also
Nova Emetivka

References

External links

Villages in Odesa Raion
Usatove Hromada